Casanova often refers to Giacomo Casanova, an 18th-century Italian adventurer best known for his legendary womanizing.

Casanova may also refer to:

People
Casanova (surname)

Film and TV
Casanova (1918 film), a 1918 Hungarian film
Casanova, or The Loves of Casanova, a 1927 French film
Casanova (1934 film), a 1934 French comedy drama film
Casanova (1971 TV serial), a BBC television serial
Casanova '73, a BBC1 sitcom starring Leslie Phillips
Fellini's Casanova, a 1976 feature film by Federico Fellini
Casanova (1987 film), an American biographical comedy TV-film directed by Simon Langton
Casanova (2005 TV serial), a 2005 BBC Television serial starring David Tennant and Peter O'Toole
Casanova (2005 film), a 2005 feature film starring Heath Ledger

Books
Casanova (novel), a 1998 novel by Andrew Miller
Casanova (comics), a 2006 espionage comic book

Music
Casanova (Benatzky), a 1928 operetta, based on music by Johann Strauss II
Casanova (German band), a German rock band
Casanovas, a Swedish dansband
The Casanovas, an Australian, Melbourne-based rock band
Casanova (rapper), American rapper
Casanova, a concerto for cello and wind orchestra by Johan de Meij

Albums
Casanova (Rondò Veneziano album)
Casanova (Udo Lindenberg album)
Casanova (The Divine Comedy album), 1996
Casanova, an album by the German rock band Casanova

Songs
"Casanova" (Anita Skorgan song), from the 1977 Eurovision Song Contest
"Casanova" (Luv' song), from the 1979 album Lots of Luv'''
"Casanova" (LeVert song), 1987 single from the album The Big Throwdown"Casanova" (Gisela song), 2008 Eurovision song by Gisela, representing Andorra
"Casanova" (Paulina Rubio song), 2002
"Casanova" (Valery Leontiev song), 1993
"Casanova" (WeRe-VaNa song), 2021
"Casanova", a song by Norwegian duo Cir.Cuz, 2016
"Casanova", a song by Roxy Music from the 1974 album Country Life"Casanova", a song by Peaches from the 2000 album The Teaches of Peaches"Casanova", a song by Allie X from the 2017 album CollXtion IIPlaces
Casanova, Haute-Corse, a commune of the Haute-Corse département of France, on the island of Corsica
Casanova, Pennsylvania, a census-designated place in Centre County, Pennsylvania, United States
Casanova, Virginia, an unincorporated community in Fauquier County, Virginia, United States

Other uses
Casanova (restaurant), a restaurant in Carmel-by-the-Sea, California, United States

See also
 Casanovva'', a 2012 Indian Malayalam romantic action thriller film